The Big Freeze is the fifth studio album by Laura Stevenson, The album was released by Don Giovanni Records on March 29, 2019. It debuted on the Billboard charts at #11 Alternative New Artist Albums, #35 for Heatseekers Albums, and #41 for Current Alternative Albums.

Track listing

References

Laura Stevenson albums
2019 albums
Don Giovanni Records albums